Fergus Crane is a children's book written by Paul Stewart and illustrated by Chris Riddell, published in 2004. It won the Nestlé Children's Book Prize Gold Award the same year.

Plot summary
Fergus Crane is a young boy, who lives in the Archduke Ferdinand Apartments with his Mother Lucia. A mysterious little flying box arrives at his house three different times which has letters in it from his 'long lost uncle Theo', warning him that he is great danger and is sending help. After this, a flying horse arrives at his window and takes him to a magnificent mountain chalet, where his adventures begin.

References

2004 British novels
Children's fantasy novels
British children's novels
British fantasy novels
2004 children's books
Doubleday (publisher) books